Route 801, or Highway 801, may refer to:

Australia 

  - Tasmania

Canada
Alberta Highway 801
 Ontario Highway 801

Costa Rica
 National Route 801

United Kingdom
 A801 road

United States
 
 
 
 
 
 Virginia State Route 801 (1928)